Takwir Rahman (born 1 January 1999) is an Indonesian professional footballer who plays as a midfielder for Liga 2 club Persela Lamongan.

Honours

Clubs
PSM Makassar
 Piala Indonesia: 2019

References

External links
 Takwir Rahman at Soccerway
 Takwir Rahman at Liga Indonesia

1999 births
Living people
Indonesian footballers
PSM Makassar players
Association football midfielders
People from Kendari